Leonor del Pilar Rodríguez Manso (born 21 October 1991) is a Spanish international basketball  player for Perfumerías Avenida and the Spanish national team.

In 2014 she participated at the 2014 FIBA World Championship winning the silver medal. In 2016 she won the silver medal in the 2016 Summer Olympics in Río. In 2017 she won the gold medal in the EuroBasket Women 2017 in Prague

Club career
Rodríguez started playing basketball as a junior in CB Islas Canarias in her native Canary Islands, playing in the Spanish top-tier league in the 2007–08 and 2008–09 seasons. At 18 she moved abroad to play in the NCAA for the Florida State Seminoles, averaging 14.9 PPG in her last year. Back in Europe, she signed for one of the Spanish top teams, Perfumerías Avenida, winning one Spanish League and two Cups in three seasons. She spent one season at Uni Girona CB before signing for Polish team Wisła Can-Pack Kraków in 2017. In 2019 she transferred to Turkish team Çukurova Basketbol and the following season she returned to Spain to win the 2021 Spanish League with Perfumerías Avenida.

European cups stats

Florida State statistics 
Source

Team overview

National team
Rodríguez started playing with Spain's youth teams at 15, winning a total of seix medals from 2006 to 2011. She made her debut with the senior team in 2014, when she was 22 years old. Up to 2021, she had 97 caps with 4.2 PPG, participating in two Olympic Games, one World Championship and two European Championship:

  2006 FIBA Europe Under-16 Championship (youth)
  2007 FIBA Europe Under-16 Championship (youth)
 5th 2008 FIBA Europe Under-18 Championship (youth)
  2009 FIBA Europe Under-18 Championship (youth)
  2009 FIBA Under-19 World Championship (youth)
  2010 FIBA Europe Under-20 Championship (youth) 
  2011 FIBA Europe Under-20 Championship (youth) 
  2014 World Championship
  2016 Summer Olympics
  2017 Eurobasket
 7th 2021 Eurobasket
 6th 2020 Summer Olympics

Notes

References

External links
 
 
 
 
 
 
 Florida State University player bio

1991 births
Living people
Florida State Seminoles women's basketball players
Spanish expatriate basketball people in the United States
Spanish women's basketball players
Spanish women's 3x3 basketball players
Shooting guards
Basketball players at the 2016 Summer Olympics
Basketball players at the 2020 Summer Olympics
Olympic basketball players of Spain
Medalists at the 2016 Summer Olympics
Olympic silver medalists for Spain
Olympic medalists in basketball
Sportspeople from Las Palmas